The 1937 World Table Tennis Championships men's singles was the 11th edition of the men's singles championship. 

Richard Bergmann defeated Alojzy Ehrlich in the final, winning three sets to two to secure the title.

Results

1937 World Rankings
 
1   Stanislav Kolář
2   Alojzy Ehrlich
3   Richard Bergmann
4   Michel Haguenauer
5   Miklós Szabados
6   Laszlo Bellak
7   Viktor Barna
8   Adrian Haydon
9   Alfred Liebster
10   Marin Vasile-Goldberger

See also
List of World Table Tennis Championships medalists

References

-